James Stewart Fraser (born 1936 in Aberdeen) is a Scottish former footballer who played as a left half. Fraser spent his entire senior career with Dundee United, making nearly 200 appearances in a ten-year spell before a broken leg halted his United career. He represented the Scottish Football League XI twice in 1962, scoring a hat-trick against the League of Ireland XI in an 11–0 win.

When he left Dundee United, Fraser signed as player manager with Brora Rangers FC in the Scottish Highland Football League, where he remained for several seasons.

References

1936 births
Footballers from Aberdeen
Living people
Scottish footballers
Dundee United F.C. players
Association football wing halves
Scottish Football League players
Scottish Football League representative players
Banks O' Dee F.C. players
Brora Rangers F.C. players
Highland Football League players